Konyshyovka (Russian: Конышёвка) is an urban-type settlement, the administrative center of Konyshyovsky District in Kursk Oblast, Russia. The population was

History 
Konyshyovka was first mentioned in the 19th century as the village on Dmitriyev to Lgov route. In 1891 the Moscow Railway was extended to that point. One version of the origin of the name Konyshyovka (Конышёвка) is from Turkic word коныш 'konysh' meaning 'stop'.

Konyshyovka as the town was founded in 1910 and had received the status of an urban-type settlement in 1968.

Demographics 

Note: Census data

Economy 
Konyshyovka has a granary, a combine fodder factory, a brick factory, an asphalt factory, a creamery, a food factory, a meat processing factory, and a pig farm.

Culture 
There are different entertainment and educational 
organizations in town: museum of local lore, public library, children's art school. 
The available newspaper is "Трибуна" ("Tribune").

Sights 
 The sculpture on bed of honor of warriors of the Soviet army, who died in February 1943.
 Some architectural monuments: building of railroad terminal, barracks, estate of Nenarokov landowner (19th century), water tower (19th century), pharmacy building (19th century), building of The District Committee of All-Union Communist Party of Bolsheviks (1946 until 1947).

References 

Urban-type settlements in Kursk Oblast
Lgovsky Uyezd